Thomas Henry Perry (12 August 1871 – 18 July 1927) was an English international footballer, who played as a right half.

Early and personal life
Perry was born in West Bromwich on 12 August 1871, the fifth of nine children. He was one of five brothers to play football, including older brother Charlie. He worked as a spring balance maker and was married with four daughters.

Career
Perry played locally for Christ Church School, Christ Church, West Bromwich Baptists and Stourbridge, and professionally for West Bromwich Albion and Aston Villa. He was transferred to Aston Villa for £50 for the 1901–02 season. He retired due to injury in 1903. With West Brom he was a runner-up in the 1894–95 FA Cup. He also earned representative honours for the Football League.

He earned one cap for England on 28 March 1898.

References

1871 births
1927 deaths
English footballers
England international footballers
Stourbridge F.C. players
West Bromwich Albion F.C. players
Aston Villa F.C. players
English Football League players
English Football League representative players
Association football wing halves
FA Cup Final players